USS Great Lakes (AD-30) was a planned  of the United States Navy.

Great Lakes was laid down on 16 April 1945 at the  Todd Pacific Shipyard in Seattle. She was cancelled on 7 January 1946, when she was around 20% complete.

References 

 

Ships built in Seattle
Shenandoah-class destroyer tenders
Cancelled ships of the United States Navy